Bolten Peak is a small isolated peak  north of the Litvillingane Rocks, on the east side of Ahlmann Ridge in Queen Maud Land. It was mapped by Norwegian cartographers from surveys and from air photos by the Norwegian–British–Swedish Antarctic Expedition (1949–52) and from air photos by the Sixth Norwegian Antarctic Expedition (1958–59), and named "Bolten" (the bolt).

References 

Mountains of Queen Maud Land
Princess Martha Coast